Club de Futbol Reus Deportiu, S.A.D. was a Spanish football team based in Reus, in the autonomous community of Catalonia. Founded in 1909, it last competed in the Segunda Division (while its B team competed in the Tercera Division) before folding during the 2018–19 Segunda División season. It held its home games at Estadi Municipal, with a capacity of 4,700 seats.

History
CD Reus was founded on 23 November 1909 after the dissolution of Reus Sport Club. On 29 September 1917, the club merged with Club Velocipedista and SC Olímpia becoming the multi-sports club Reus Deportiu.

In 1951, Reus Deportiu was restructured into two independent entities: CF Reus Deportiu, entirely dedicated to football, and Reus Deportiu, supporting the other sports, roller hockey being the most well known.

After several years playing in Segunda División B, Reus qualified in 2015 to the promotion play-offs for the first time in its history. It was defeated in the second round by Racing Ferrol.

In 2015, the club reached the round of 32 of the 2015–16 Copa del Rey, where it was defeated by Atlético Madrid. In that season, the club also qualified to the promotion play-offs, this time as champion of the Segunda División B Group 3. In the first leg, Reus beat Racing de Santander by 3–0 away, and achieved the first promotion ever to Segunda División after a 1–0 home win in the second leg, played on 29 May 2016.

On 18 January 2019, the Liga de Fútbol Profesional suspended the rights of Reus to continue competing in the competition and ten days later the club was expelled from the competition for three years plus a fine of €250,000 due to the nonpayment of players' salaries.

In July 2019, after the draw of the groups for the 2019–20 Segunda División B, Reus was excluded again due to the non-payment and relegated to Tercera División, from which the club was expelled in September for the non-payment of its debt with the RFEF and non-appearance in the first two matches. It was also ruled that the club could not play in the three Catalan regional leagues until its debts were settled. In October 2019, the Court of Arbitration for Sport ordered that Reus be reinstated to Segunda B but could not be implemented, and in July 2020, the club was kept out of league football yet again for non-payment of its reserve team players.

On 20 October 2020, Reus was liquidated on the Court, after the club's owners failed to present a plan to pay off the debts, estimated in more than €9 million.

Season to season

3 seasons in Segunda División
10 seasons in Segunda División B
48 seasons in Tercera División

Retired numbers
7 –  Jordi Pitarque MF (2009–10) – posthumous honour

Notable players

Players who appeared in more than 100 league matches for the club and/or reached international status.

Coaches
 José Juncosa (1981–82)
 Josep Seguer (1983)
 José Juncosa (1985–87)
 Miguel Ángel Rubio (2001–02)
 Natxo González (2003–07)
 Ramón Calderé (2007–09)
 Santi Castillejo (2009–13)
 Emili Vicente (2013–14)
 Natxo González (2014–17)
 Aritz López Garai (2017–2018)
 Xavi Bartolo (2018–2019)

See also
CF Reus Deportiu B, reserve team.

References

External links
Official website 
Futbolme team profile 
Reus24, unofficial website 

CF Reus Deportiu
Football clubs in Catalonia
Association football clubs established in 1909
1909 establishments in Spain
Association football clubs disestablished in 2020
2020 disestablishments in Spain
Sport in Reus
Defunct football clubs in Catalonia
Segunda División clubs